The 2021–22 South West Peninsula League season was the 15th in the history of the South West Peninsula League, a football competition in England that feeds the Premier Division of the Western Football League. The league was formed in 2007 from the merger of the Devon County League and the South Western League, and is restricted to clubs based in Cornwall and Devon. The two divisions of the South West Peninsula League are on the same level of the National League System as the Western League Division One (Step 6).

The constitution was announced on 18 May 2021.

After the abandonment of the 2019–20 and 2020–21 seasons due to the COVID-19 pandemic, a number of promotions were decided on a points per game basis over the previous two seasons.

Premier Division East

Premier Division East features 20 teams, the same number as the previous season, after Ilfracombe Town and Millbrook were promoted to the Western League Premier Division.

Two clubs joined from the Devon Football League South & West Division:
Okehampton Argyle
Ottery St Mary

On 2 June 2021, Stoke Gabriel merged with Torbay Police, creating Stoke Gabriel & Torbay Police.

League table

Results table

Stadia and locations

Premier Division West

Premier Division West features 18 teams, reduced from 20 the previous season after Helston Athletic, Mousehole and Saltash United were promoted to the Western League Premier Division.

One new club joined from the St Piran Football League West Division:
Penryn Athletic

League table

Results table

Stadia and locations

References

External links
 South West Peninsula League

South West Peninsula League
10